In Greek mythology, Perses (Ancient Greek: Πέρσης) was the son of Andromeda and Perseus. Perses was left in Cossaei and with the Oceanid Perse fathered descendants.

Greek mythology identified Perses as the ancestor of the Persians. Apparently the Persians knew the story as Xerxes tried to use it to bribe the Argives during his invasion of Greece, but ultimately failed to do so. The (Pseudo-)Platonic dialogue First Alcibiades (120e), written in the late 4th-century BC, identifies him with Achaemenes as the hero-founder of the Persái, stating both Achaemenes and Heracles were sons of Perseus.

Notes

Perseid dynasty
Characters in Greek mythology